The Asia-Pacific Journal of Operational Research (APJOR) aims to provide a "forum for practitioners, academics and researchers in Operational Research and related fields, within and beyond the Asia-Pacific region". It is also the official journal of the Association of Asian-Pacific Operational Research Societies within IFORS (APORS)] and is published by World Scientific. It has an emphasis on papers of practical relevance to the field of Operational Research.

Participating societies 
 Australian Society for Operations Research
 Operations Research Society of China
 Hong Kong Operational Research Society
 Operational Research Society of India
 The Operations Research Society of Japan
 Korean Operations Research and Management Science Society
 Management Science/ Operations Research Society of Malaysia
 Operational Research Society of New Zealand (Inc.)
 Operations Research Society of the Philippines
 Operational Research Society of Singapore

Abstracting and indexing 
The journal is indexed in Mathematical Reviews, Science Citation Index Expanded, CompuMath Citation Index, Zentralblatt MATH, Compendex, and Inspec.

References 

World Scientific academic journals
Publications established in 2004
Mathematics journals
English-language journals